Nanna melanosticta is a moth of the subfamily Arctiinae. It was described by George Thomas Bethune-Baker in 1911. It is found in Angola and Ghana.

References

 Natural History Museum Lepidoptera generic names catalog

Lithosiini
Moths described in 1911